Franz G. Jacob (Jakob) (1870–?) was a German chess master.

Born in Strasbourg, Alsace, he took 16th at Munich 1900 (the 12th DSB Congress, Géza Maróczy, Harry Pillsbury and Carl Schlechter won), tied for 27-28th in the Ostend 1907 chess tournament (Masters' Tournament, Ossip Bernstein and Akiba Rubinstein won), tied for 9-12th at Düsseldorf 1908 (the 16th DSB Congress, Frank Marshall won), and withdrew after round 6 at Hamburg 1910 (the 17th DSB Congress).

References

1870 births
German chess players
Sportspeople from Strasbourg
Year of death missing